Players and pairs who neither have high enough rankings nor receive wild cards may participate in a qualifying tournament held one week before the annual Wimbledon Tennis Championships.

In 2015, the qualifiers were: Vincent Millot, Alejandro Falla, Elias Ymer, Hiroki Moriya, Luke Saville, Igor Sijsling, Pierre-Hugues Herbert, Yūichi Sugita, Nikoloz Basilashvili, John-Patrick Smith, Michael Berrer, Dustin Brown, Aleksandr Nedovyesov, Horacio Zeballos, John Millman and Kenny de Schepper.

Luca Vanni received as a Lucky loser as a replacement of David Ferrer, who was originally placed in the main draw before the start of the tournament, but was suffered by an elbow injury before the tournament began.

Seeds

Qualifiers

Lucky losers

Qualifying draw

First qualifier

Second qualifier

Third qualifier

Fourth qualifier

Fifth qualifier

Sixth qualifier

Seventh qualifier

Eighth qualifier

Ninth qualifier

Tenth qualifier

Eleventh qualifier

Twelfth qualifier

Thirteenth qualifier

Fourteenth qualifier

Fifteenth qualifier

Sixteenth qualifier

References
 Qualifying draw
 2015 Wimbledon Championships – Men's draws and results at the International Tennis Federation

Men's Singles Qualifying
Wimbledon Championship by year – Men's singles qualifying